Q92 may refer to:

Radio stations

Canada 
 CFQR-FM, in Montreal, Quebec (identified as Q92 from 1992 to 2009)
 CJRQ-FM, in Sudbury, Ontario (identified as Q92 from 1990 to 2016)
 CJQQ-FM, in Timmins, Ontario (identified as Q92 from 1992 to 2016)

United States 
 KBLQ, in Logan, Utah
 KQRQ, in Rapid City, South Dakota
 KQRS-FM, in Minneapolis-St. Paul, Minnesota
 WDJQ, in Canton, Ohio
 WERQ-FM, in Baltimore, Maryland (as 92Q)
 WFNZ-FM, in Charlotte, North Carolina
 WRNQ, in Poughkeepsie, New York
 WYRQ-FM, in Little Falls, Minnesota
 KQVT, in Victoria, Texas

Other uses 
 Al-Lail, a surah of the Quran